José Jesús Yégüez Salgado (born 16 September 1987) is a Venezuelan footballer that currently plays for Aragua FC of the Venezuelan Primera División as left back.

References

External links
  
 
 BDFA Profile 
 José Yégüez at Football Lineups

1987 births
Living people
Venezuelan footballers
Deportivo Anzoátegui players
Zulia F.C. players
Deportivo Táchira F.C. players
Aragua FC players
Association football defenders
People from Puerto la Cruz